Lars-Erik Hansson (born 16 June 1959) is a former Swedish handball player who competed in the 1984 Summer Olympics.

In 1984 he finished fifth with the Swedish team in the Olympic tournament. He played two matches and scored two goals.

References

1959 births
Living people
Swedish male handball players
Olympic handball players of Sweden
Handball players at the 1984 Summer Olympics
20th-century Swedish people